= Masai Brown =

Saint Vincent and Grenadine association football player (born 2003)

Personal information
- Full name: Masai Amani Brown-Andrews
- Date of birth: 26 May 2003 (age 23)
- Place of birth: Indiana
- Position: Midfielder

Team information
- Current team: Panserraikos

Youth career
- 2021-2022: Real Oviedo
- 2022-: Panserraikos

International career
Years	Team	Apps	(Gls)
2023-	St Vincent and the Grenadines	4	(0)

Masai Amani Brown-Andrews (born 26 May 2003) is a footballer for Panserraikos F.C. and the Saint Vincent and the Grenadines national football team.

== Club career ==
Born in Indiana in the United States, Brown moved to Spain in 2021 to join the youth system of Real Oviedo. In October 2022, he joined Greek side Panserraikos.

== Style of play ==
He plays as a central midfielder.

== International career ==
He was called up to the senior Saint Vincent and the Grenadines national football team in November 2023. He made his senior debut in the CONCACAF Nations League on 17 November 2023, away against Bermuda.
